Juana Josefa Joaquina del Pino y Vera Mujica (December 21, 1786 - December 14, 1841) was the daughter of the viceroy of the Río de la Plata Joaquín del Pino and wife of Bernardino Rivadavia, first President of Argentina, and therefore the first woman to become First Lady of Argentina.

Early life 
Born in Montevideo, Uruguay, Juana was the fourth daughter of the viceroy Joaquín del Pino and his second wife, the Argentine vicereine Rafaela de Vera Mujica y López Pintado.

In 1801, when her father was appointed viceroy of the Rio de la Plata, the family, which was in Chile, moved to Buenos Aires. Juana was then 15 years old. There, in one of the ceremonies organized by his father, she met her future husband, Bernardino Rivadavia. She was 17 years old and Bernardino 23 years old. Their courtship, binding and boring, lasted six years.

Marriage and children 
On August 14, 1809 they were married in the Church of Nuestra Señora de La Merced, Buenos Aires. The newlyweds spent their honeymoon in the splendid and oldest ranch of Zarate, called Las Palmas. They had four children, three sons and one daughter:  José Joaquín Benito Egidio (August 31, 1810 - May 7, 1887), Constancia (August 26, 1812 - July 20, 1816), Bernardino Donato (February 17, 1814 - October 21, 1881), and Martín (April 22, 1823 - June 29, 1885).

Death 
On December 14, 1841, Juana del Pino de Rivadavia died in the Brazilian capital. Her death was caused by sepsis after breaking a leg. Her husband returned to Spain in 1842, where he died in Cadiz, on September 2, 1845.

1786 births
1841 deaths
First ladies and gentlemen of Argentina
19th-century Argentine people